is a Japanese singer and idol. She is a member of the Japanese idol girl group NMB48 as part of Team N.

Biography 
Kato passed NMB48's 3rd generation auditions in December 2011. Her debut was on February 18, 2012. In October 2012, she was selected to Team BII.

In February 2014, during AKB48's Group Shuffle, Kato was transferred to Team N.

In June 2015, at the AKB48 41st Senbatsu Sousenkyo, Kato ranked for the first time at #59, putting her into Future Girls

In October 2016, during NMB48’s 6th Anniversary Live, Kato was transferred to Team M, becoming the first NMB48 member to have been into three teams. She began her activities with Team M (along with Teams N and BII) in January 2017.

In AKB48’s 49th Single Senbatsu Sousenkyo held in June 18th 2017, Kato ranked 33rd Place and became center of Next Girls.

In AKB48’s 53rd Sekai Senbatsu Sousenkyo held in June 2018, Kato ranked 86th, placing her into The 10th AKB48 World Senbatsu Sousenkyo Kinen Waku

In NMB48 Daisokaku 2019, Kato was transferred back to Team BII

In 2021, Kato was transferred from Team BII to Promoted Members when teams were disbanded.

Later, NMB48 reformed teams and Kato was appointed member of Team N.

Discography

NMB48 singles

AKB48 singles

Appearances

Stage Units
NMB48 Kenkyuusei Stage "Aitakatta"
 "Nageki no Figure"
 "Nagisa no CHERRY"
 "Senaka Kara Dakishimete"
 "Rio no Kakumei"

Team BII 1st Stage "Aitakatta"
 "Nageki no Figure"
 "Koi no PLAN"
 "Senaka Kara Dakishimete"
 "Rio no Kakumei"

Team BII 2nd Stage "Tadaima Renaichuu"
 "Faint"

Team N 3rd Stage "Koko ni Datte Tenshi wa Iru" (Revival)
 "Nando mo Nerae!"
 "Hajimete no Hoshi"
 "100nen Saki Demo"

External links
 NMB48 Official Profile
 Official Blog

References

1997 births
Living people
Japanese idols
Japanese women pop singers
People from Osaka Prefecture
Musicians from Osaka Prefecture
NMB48 members
Produce 48 contestants
21st-century Japanese women singers
21st-century Japanese singers